Shrikant Jayawantrao Jadhav (born 15 March 1960) is an Indian former first-class cricketer who played for Maharashtra. He became a selector for the Maharashtra Cricket Association and a match referee, after his playing career.

Life and career
Jadhav played as an all-rounder who batted right-handed and bowled right-arm off break. He appeared in 53 first-class and 10 List A matches, in a career that lasted 12 seasons from 1982/83 to 1993/94. He also appeared for India Under-25s against the visiting Sri Lankan team in December 1986. He was a member of the Maharashtra team that finished runners-up at the 1992–93 Ranji Trophy and took a five-wicket haul in the final against Punjab. He also represented West Zone in the early-1990s.

After retirement, Jadhav worked as a selector for the Maharashtra Cricket Association in its senior team selection panel. He also officiated in domestic cricket matches as a match referee.

References

External links 
 

1960 births
Living people
Indian cricketers
Maharashtra cricketers
West Zone cricketers
Cricketers from Pune